Ulpia may refer to:

People
 Ulpia gens, ancient Roman family which produced the emperor Trajan (98–117)

Places
A number of Roman settlements, mostly named in honour of the Emperoro Trajan: 
 Ulpia Traiana Sarmizegetusa, the capital of Roman Dacia, located near modern Tapae in Romania
 Ulpia Noviomagus Batavorum, modern Nijmegen, Netherlands.
 Colonia Ulpia Traiana, modern Xanten, Germany.
 Civitas Ulpia Sueborum Nicretum, modern Ladenburg, Germany.
 Colonia Ulpia Traiana Poetovio, modern Ptuj, Slovenia.
 Ulpia Serdica, another name for Sofia, the capital of Bulgaria.
 Colonia Ulpia Oescensium or Oescus, near modern Pleven, Bulgaria.
 Colonia Ulpia Ratiaria, near modern Archar, Bulgaria.
 Marcianopolis Ulpia, another name for Marcianopolis, Bulgaria.
 Ulpia Nicopolis, another name for Nicopolis ad Istrum, near mordern Veliko Tarnovo, Bulgaria.
 Ulpia Topira, another name for Topeiros, near modern Evlalo, northeastern Greece.
 Colonia Concordia Ulpia Trajana Augusta Frugifera Hadrumetina, another name for Hadrumetum, Tunisia.
 Colonia Marciana Ulpia Traiana Thamugadi, another name for Timgad, Algeria.